The British Soap Award for Villain of the Year is an award presented annually by the British Soap Awards. Unlike the awards for Best Leading Performer and Best British Soap, the award is voted for by a panel, like the award for Best Newcomer. Coronation Street is the most awarded soap in the category, with eight wins. Emmerdale is the only current soap not to have won a Villain of the Year award, while Family Affairs (1997–2005) never won the accolade. The award is currently held by Coronation Street actor Maximus Evans, who played Corey Brent.

Winners and nominees

Wins and nominations by soap

Notes

References

Soap opera awards
The British Soap Awards